Sam Groth and Chris Guccione were the defending champions, but lost in the quarterfinals to Wesley Koolhof and Matwé Middelkoop.
Édouard Roger-Vasselin and Radek Štěpánek won the title, defeating Mate Pavić and Michael Venus in the final, 7–5, 6–3.

Seeds

Draw

Draw

References
Main Draw

Claro Open Colombia - Doubles
2015 Doubles